"Closer" (stylized as "CLOSER") is the second single by Japanese-American recording artist Joe Inoue. The song was used as one of the opening themes of Naruto: Shippuden. "Closer" is the most successful of Inoue's singles, peaking at 22 on the Oricon Weekly Singles Charts and remaining on the charts for seven weeks. Both the title track and "Gravity" are included on Me! Me! Me!.

Inoue later digitally released an English language cover of the title track on May 19, 2010. This version was later included as a bonus track on Dos Angeles.

A subsequent digital EP of the song was also released to the American iTunes Store on October 5, 2010. The EP includes the three variations of "Closer" from the original CD release as well as the English version.

Track listing
 "Closer" – 3:26
 "Gravity" – 3:09
  – 2:15
  – 1:30
  – 3:26

References

External links
 Joe Inoue's official website 

2008 singles
2008 songs
Joe Inoue songs
Ki/oon Music singles
Naruto songs